The Pakistani national cricket team visited Zimbabwe in March 1993 and played a single Limited Overs International (LOI) only on 2 March 1993 at Harare Sports Club, Harare, against the Zimbabwean national cricket team. Pakistan won by 7 wickets and were captained by Wasim Akram; Zimbabwe by David Houghton.

ODI summary

References

External links

1993 in Pakistani cricket
1993 in Zimbabwean cricket
Pakistani cricket tours of Zimbabwe
International cricket competitions from 1991–92 to 1994
Zimbabwean cricket seasons from 1980–81 to 1999–2000